Azet  is a commune in the Hautes-Pyrénées department in the Occitanie region of south-western France.

The inhabitants of the commune are known as Azetois or Azetoises.

Geography
Azet is located some 55 km south by south-east of Tarbes and 20 km west of Bagnères-de-Luchon. Access to the commune is by road D225 from Estensan in the west to the village. The public square of the village is 1,172 metres above sea level at the intersection of the Aure and Louron valleys with the Col de Val Louron-Azet to the south-east.  The commune is very rugged and inaccessible with extensive forests in the south.

The Ruisseau de Lustau flows north from the Lustou Lake in the south of the commune, gathering many tributaries including the Ruisseau de Sarrouyes which flows from lakes in the south-east of the commune, and becoming the Mousquere before passing the village and continuing north to join the Neste d'Aure north of Vielle-Aure.

Climate
Azet has a mountain climate with high temperatures in summer.

Neighbouring communes and villages

Toponymy
The probable etymology of the name is Adet, adou, ados, âne, asou, then Azet meaning a place marking the end of the terrain which could only be crossed by donkey or horse.

History

There is little evidence to trace the origin of the village except the church, which dates from the fourth quarter of the 12th century In 1887 the village had two primary schools. Village resources were mainly pastoralism with livestock farming of sheep, cows, horses, and donkeys as well as crops such as wheat, rye, meslin, barley, buckwheat, beans, peas, potatoes, turnips, flax sprouts, and hay.

From the 1880s the population decreased due to the waves of typhoid fever during 1886-1887 and the rural exodus of young people.

Heraldry

Administration

List of Successive Mayors

Population

Culture and heritage

Civil heritage
The commune has a number of sites that are registered as historical monuments:
Houses and Farms (18th-19th century)
A Farmhouse (1865)

Other sites of interest
The Pyrenean House of Pastoralism is an educational and tourist centre on pastoralism in the mountains. The museum traces the history and development of pastoralism in France and worldwide.

Religious heritage

The Church of Our Lady of the Assumption (12th century) is registered as an historical monument. The Church contains a very large number of items that are registered as historical objects.

See also
Communes of the Hautes-Pyrénées department

References

External links
Azet on the old IGN website 
Azet on Géoportail, National Geographic Institute (IGN) website 
Azet on the 1750 Cassini Map

Communes of Hautes-Pyrénées